Hrabro (English: Bravely) is the fifth studio album by Serbian singer and songwriter Marija Šerifović.

Track listing 
Vidim te svuda
Gorka hrabrost
Mrš
Izvini se
Ružna strana ljubavi
Podseti me
Samo tvoja
Ja volim svoj greh

External links
 Marija Šerifović Official Page (Serbian and English)
 On: www.discogs.com

2014 albums
Marija Šerifović albums